Dulari (real name Ambika Gautam) (18 April 1928 – 18 January 2013) was an Indian actress, who worked as character actor in Hindi cinema, appearing in 135 films, most notably Jab Pyar Kisi Se Hota Hai (1961), Mujhe Jeene Do (1963), Teesri Kasam (1966), Padosan (1968) and Deewaar (1975).

Early life
Dulari was born on 18 April 1928 in Nagpur, Maharashtra. Her real name was Ambika Gautam. She was a Kanyakubja Brahmin from the Awadh region of Uttar Pradesh. She was nick-named Rajdulari and later on only Dulari remained by which she was known.

Career
Forced to look for work after her father's illness, Dulari made her film debut with Bahen(1941), Hamari Baat (1943), produced by Bombay Talkies, and went to appear as a character actor in over 135 films in the following six decades. Her last screen appearance was in Ziddi (1997) directed by Guddu Dhanoa.

Her most notable role was in Jeevan Jyoti (1953). Her other important roles were in Pati Seva, Rangeen Kahani (1945) and some Gujarati films, Chundi ane Chokha (1957), Gunsundari (1948), Mangal Fera (1948).

Her other films are Karyavar (Gujarati), Aankh ka Taara, Akhri Daku, Darinda, Ahuti, Naastik, Dillagi and Darwaza.

Personal life
She married sound recordist J. B. Jagtap in 1952, and took a break from acting for nine years.

Death
She died in an old age home in Pune, Maharashtra at the age of 84. She had been suffering from Alzheimer's disease, and was bedridden for over two years. Through the last years of her life Cine & TV Artistes Association (CINTAA)  had started providing her financial assistance after veteran actress Waheeda Rehman brought up her case. She was survived by her daughter Charulata Jagtap and grandsons who have settled in Australia.

Selected filmography

References

External links
 
 Dulari at Upperstall

1928 births
2013 deaths
Indian film actresses
Actresses in Hindi cinema
20th-century Indian actresses
Deaths from dementia in India
Deaths from Alzheimer's disease